Akuma (悪魔, Japanese for "Devil", "Demon"), known in Japan as , is a fictional character and the secondary antagonist of the Street Fighter series of fighting games by Capcom. Akuma made his debut in Super Street Fighter II Turbo as a secret character and boss. In the storyline of the Street Fighter video games, he is the younger brother of Gouken, Ryu's and Ken's master. Since his debut, Akuma has appeared in several subsequent titles and has been well-received by both fans and critics.

Creation
Akuma was created by request of Noritaka Funamizu to Akira Yasuda when creating a new Street Fighter character. Akuma was designed in order to please fans who were victims of April's Fools in the claims from journalists that there was a hidden character named Sheng Long. Funamizu wanted the character, Akuma, to be based on Ryu's design. While still being an evil character, Yasuda still wanted to create a major contrast between the regular boss, M. Bison and Akuma.

Akuma has dark red hair, dark skin tone, glowing red eyes with black sclera, wears prayer beads around his neck, a dark gray karate gi and a piece of twine around his waist in lieu of an obi. The kanji "ten" (天) — meaning "Heaven" — can be seen on his back when it appears during certain win animations. Shin Akuma's appearance is very similar to Akuma's; for example, in the Street Fighter Alpha series, Shin Akuma had a purple karate gi instead of a dark gray one and marginally darker skin tone. Akuma's introduction in Super Street Fighter II Turbo stemmed from the development team's desire to introduce a "mysterious and really powerful" character, with his status as a hidden character within the game resulting from later discussions. When asked regarding the presence of Akuma as a secret character in several of Capcom's fighting games, Capcom's Noritaka Funamizu stated that, while he did not personally support the concept, he said, "Akuma is a character that can fit in any game design nicely". Matt Edwards of Capcom Europe considered Akuma the most powerful Street Fighter character.

Rich Knight of Complex described Akuma as "a character who must constantly be on the offense, because he takes a shit ton of damage when he's not."

Akuma's appearance remained consistent until Street Fighter V where his hair reaches far longer and has grown around his face, like a lion's mane. Takayuki Nakayama explained that the staff considered multiple designs that were scrapped such as a shirtless look, multiple scars within the body, one with a broken shirt and one where he carried a baby.

Appearances

Street Fighter game series
Akuma made his debut in Super Street Fighter II Turbo, the fifth arcade iteration of the Street Fighter II games, where he appears as a hidden and unnamed character. After meeting certain requirements, Akuma appears prior to the player's final match with M. Bison and obliterates M. Bison before challenging the player. He also has two endings in the game as well: one for defeating M. Bison and another against himself. While the dialogue in these endings was omitted from the international releases of the arcade game, they were edited into one ending and included in the English localization of Super Turbo Revival for the Game Boy Advance. Shin Akuma is, however, an unlockable playable character in the Game Boy Advance version of the game, Super Street Fighter II Turbo Revival, as well as the Japan-only Dreamcast version of the game, Super Street Fighter II X for Matching Service. In the latter version, another version of Akuma referred to as Tien Gouki can also be selected.

Akuma appears in Street Fighter Alpha: Warriors' Dreams, where he was given his name, once again as a hidden opponent and unlockable character. His backstory remains the same as in Super Turbo. Akuma was added to the immediate roster in Street Fighter Alpha 2 and Street Fighter Alpha 3, with a powered-up version of the character named "Shin Akuma" appearing as a hidden opponent. The character's relation with other Street Fighter characters begins to be fleshed out, establishing rivalries with Guy, Adon, Gen and Ryu. Shin Akuma, rather than "Final Bison", is Evil Ryu's final boss in the console versions of Street Fighter Alpha 3.

Akuma and Shin Akuma are featured in Street Fighter EX as hidden boss characters, where he is one of the few characters able to move out of the 2D playing field, during his teleport. Akuma also appears in the arcade and home video game console adaption of Street Fighter: The Movie despite not appearing in the movie.

Akuma is featured in the Street Fighter III sub-series beginning with Street Fighter III 2nd Impact: Giant Attack. Like in his debut in Super Turbo, Akuma is both a secret opponent who serves as an alternate final boss and an unlockable character, with the CPU-controlled version being the "Shin Akuma" incarnation introduced in Alpha 2. He is a regular character in Street Fighter III 3rd Strike: Fight for the Future. Akuma reappears in Street Fighter IV, being one of the main antagonists and once again a secret boss in the Arcade Mode as well as an unlockable character in both
console versions. Unlike Shin Akuma, Oni is the being that would consume Akuma after transcending all of his humanity and mastering the Satsui no Hado. Akuma returns in Street Fighter V as a downloadable character.

Other video games
Akuma has appeared in some form or another through many Capcom games outside the Street Fighter franchise. The first of these appearances was in the fighting game X-Men: Children of the Atom, where Akuma (in his Super Turbo incarnation) appears as a nameless hidden character. He would appear in the later Marvel-licensed fighting games (see Marvel vs. Capcom series). In X-Men vs. Street Fighter, he is a regular character but–in a nod to his hidden character status in other games–his select box is hidden. In Marvel Super Heroes vs. Street Fighter, he appears both as a selectable character and as "Cyber Akuma" ("Mech Gouki" in Japan), a mechanized version enhanced by Apocalypse acting as the horseman of Death and the final boss. He is absent from Marvel vs. Capcom: Clash of Super Heroes; in his stead, Ryu has a Hyper Combo that changes his fighting style to incorporate Akuma's moveset. He reappears as a playable character in the sequels: Marvel vs. Capcom 2: New Age of Heroes, Marvel vs. Capcom 3: Fate of Two Worlds and Ultimate Marvel vs. Capcom 3.

In the SNK vs. Capcom series, Akuma appears in SNK vs. Capcom: The Match of the Millennium as an unlockable character and in Capcom vs. SNK: Millennium Fight 2000 as a Ratio 4 character. He also appears in Capcom vs. SNK 2 and SNK vs. Capcom: SVC Chaos as both regular Akuma and Shin Akuma. In Capcom vs. SNK 2, a different form of Shin Akuma appears. This form of Akuma achieves a new level of power when a dying Rugal Bernstein pours his Orochi power into him. Also, various version of Akuma have appeared in the SNK vs. Capcom: Card Fighters Clash series.

Akuma appears as a special guest character in Tekken 7. In the game's story, he seeks to repay a debt to Kazumi Mishima for saving his life from an unknown critical situation, who asks him to kill her husband Heihachi and his son Kazuya for her if she dies. When Heihachi is finally dead for good at the hands of Kazuya, he is Akuma's only target left. Similar to his appearances in the Street Fighter series, Akuma replaces Kazumi as a secret arcade mode final boss if certain conditions are met. Akuma was originally planned to be the only guest character for Tekken 7, due to Katsuhiro Harada and Michael Murray saying they both don't really like the guest characters because it throws off the Tekken world and setting. However, Murray also explained that Akuma was a great fit and that there is a chance for more guests in the future. Tekken 7 started getting three more guest characters: Geese Howard from SNK's Fatal Fury fighting game series in November 2017, Noctis Lucis Caelum from Final Fantasy XV in March 2018, and Negan Smith from The Walking Dead in February 2019. Akuma also appears as an unlockable guest character on Tekken Mobile.

He also appears in Namco × Capcom. He appears as both a playable character and one of the final boss characters in the crossover fighting game Street Fighter X Tekken. Akuma also appears in the fighting video game Street Fighter X Mega Man, as a hidden boss. Akuma also appears in Super Puzzle Fighter II Turbo as the final boss, Super Gem Fighter Mini Mix (known as Pocket Fighter in Japan) as an unlockable character, and in the Japanese console version of Cyberbots: Full Metal Madness as a mecha named "Zero Gouki". He is featured in a DLC episode of the action video game Asura's Wrath, alongside Ryu as an opponent. In Super Smash Bros. Ultimate, Akuma appears as a "spirit"; a type of collectible item that can be used to enhance the abilities of playable characters. Akuma also appears in Capcom's collaboration in Monster Hunter Rise. Akuma also appears as a "crossover" character in Brawlhalla with mirrored abilities of Val.

Other media
Akuma made cameo appearances in Street Fighter II: The Animated Movie and in the Japanese TV series Street Fighter II V. Actor and martial artist Joey Ansah played Akuma in the short film Street Fighter: Legacy. Akuma also appears in Street Fighter: Assassin's Fist, an online series by Capcom and the creators of Street Fighter: Legacy with Ansah reprised his role from Legacy and Gaku Space as Young Gouki. In Assassin's Fist, both of Akuma's names are used; Akuma being the moniker Gouki had assumed after the Satsui no Hado took him over completely. Both Ansah and Space will return for the second season titled Street Fighter: World Warrior.

Akuma's first speaking appearance in animation was in an episode of the American Street Fighter animated series titled "Strange Bedfellows". He reappears in another episode, "The World's Greatest Warrior", in which he defeats Ryu and Ken's master Gouken and challenges Gouken's two students to a duel.

Akuma also figures in the Japanese OVA Street Fighter Alpha: The Animation, where Ryu's encounters with Akuma triggers the "Dark Hadou" in Ryu. Akuma is also the central focus in the OVA Street Fighter Alpha: Generations, which explores his past and ties the character's past with Ryu's. He appears in the beginning of the movie Street Fighter 4: The Ties That Bind, where he enters Ryu's mind and torments him.

UDON Entertainment's line of Street Fighter comics sets Akuma in his origin story on how he became a demon and murdering Goutetsu with the power of the Dark Hadou; he fights against Gouken ten years later, as they fight, Gouken eventually wins against Akuma as he falls off a cliff; Gouken tries to save him, but Akuma willingly drops himself into a river, only for him to survive the drop.

In 2012, band MegaDriver released a song about Akuma's character, called "Wrath of the Raging Demon". In 2014, band Skelator released a song about Akuma, called "Raging Demon". In 2015, rapper Tauz released a tribute song to Akuma, called "Rap do Akuma". In 2021, band RAVENOUS E.H. released a song about Akuma, called "Die 1,000 Deaths".

Akuma (and indeed Street Fighter in general) forms a substantial part of the Rensuke Oshikiri manga and Netflix TV series Hi Score Girl; Akuma is discovered (as a hidden character) by the female lead Oono (who typically plays Zangief), and Akuma subsequently becomes the fighter and alter-ego of Hidaka, Oono's rival. The animated show contains long sequences of actual gameplay (that is, recorded video of actual gameplay) intercut with the animation. The bulk of episode 20 is the long battle between Hidaka playing Akuma and Oono playing Zangief.

Reception

Akuma has received much critical acclaim from various gaming media outlets. Japanese magazine Gamest named him one of their "Top 50 Characters of 1996", in a three-way tie for 37th. He placed first in Game Informer's 2009 list of their "Top Ten Best Fighting Game Characters". Ryan Clements of IGN said in 2009: "Although M. Bison might be thought of as a notorious Street Fighter villain, Akuma is clearly the fan-favorite 'bad guy'". Elton Jones of Complex deemed Akuma the "most dominant fighting game character" in 2012: "Anybody that can lay out M. Bison with ease gets the number-one spot in everything." GamesRadar said of the character in 2013: "He differs from other villains in that his motives aren't inherently evil—but ... he has no qualms with killing his teacher or his own brother in combat." Alex Eckman-Lawn of Topless Robot deemed him the "most diabolical" fighting-game boss: "Few experiences from the pre-Internet video-game era made as striking an impression as the time Akuma literally just glided in, murdered M. Bison in a blink, and challenged you, the player, to a real fight." Bryan Dawson of Prima Games commented, "It's hard to imagine any new Street Fighter game without this man, as he adds a sense of evil that even M. Bison can't replicate."

Robert Workman of GameDaily rated Akuma eleventh in his 2008 selection of the "Top 25 Capcom Characters of All Time", as he "summons some of the sickest attacks ever seen in a fighting game." GameSpot readers chose Akuma for the ninth spot in their 2008 selection of the ten best video game villains and the site itself deemed Akuma "the toughest fighter" in the Street Fighter series. Rich Knight of Complex, in 2012, placed Akuma's SSFII Turbo appearance runner-up to Shao Kahn in Mortal Kombat II as the "coolest boss battle ever": "Akuma rushed into our lives and onto the screen ... and then demolish[ed] you in seconds." Akuma placed 43rd in IGN's selection of the top 100 video game villains, for his "always intimidating" appearance. Ben Lee of Digital Spy named him the sixth-best series character on the grounds that he was "truly exciting to fight against" in Super Street Fighter II Turbo, "and his cold, emotionless personality was utterly terrifying." Paste rated Akuma 23rd in their 2016 ranking of Street Fighter's 97 total playable characters, describing him as "a great anti-hero to offset Ryu and Ken."

Chad Hunter of Complex ranked Akuma's "Raging Demon" among the "25 Most Revolutionary Kill Moves in Video Games" at third: "Akuma radiates flames, grabs his opponent and the screen goes black and all you [hear] is a flurry of hits." Prima Games named it the seventh-"greatest fighting move in video game history" out of fifty in 2014, and Arcade Sushi's Angelo Dargenio considered it "one of the most well-known super moves in videogame history, spawning several parody moves in multiple fighting games over the years." WhatCulture has named the Raging Demon as the "Most Iconic Street Fighter Special/Super Move", stating "While the Hadouken attack is undoubtedly the most recognisable Street Fighter special move, nothing can beat the satisfaction of utterly destroying your opponent by landing the Raging Demon." Gavin Jasper of Den of Geek, in 2016, named Akuma in X-Men: Children of the Atom as the top fighting-game guest character. While Jason Fanelli of Arcade Sushi considered it "the best guest turn he's ever done," he simultaneously criticized his cameo in Cyberbots: Full Metal Madness: "Akuma doesn't need to be a giant mech for extra exposure." Chris Hoadley of VentureBeat labeled Akuma one of the "best fighting game clones" in 2014: "Capcom is no stranger to reusing [character] models. Ryu has had Ken as a rival since the first Street Fighter, and over time he would meet more 'shotos' who had an affinity for karate gis, fireballs, and uppercuts." GamesRadar's David Houghton rated Akuma's Street Fighter 3: 3rd Strike stage among the "27 most amazing fighting game backgrounds": "Gloomily ethereal, black-skied woodland setting with subliminally oppressive fisheye-lens effect? You are definitely going to die."

However, Akuma has often been criticized for his perceived status as an excessively powerful character in the Street Fighter series. Scott Baird of Screen Rant named him the second-"most unfairly overpowered fighting game character" behind Meta Knight of Super Smash Bros. in 2016, for the potency of his offensive attacks that resulted in Akuma being banned from SSFII Turbo tournaments. GamePro considered Akuma one of the "Most Broken Characters in Videogame History", for his "ridiculously powerful" moves that were "the bane of newbies and veterans alike," a sentiment that was echoed by Christopher Hooton of Metro in 2013. In 2014, Lucas Sullivan of GamesRadar ranked Akuma eleventh in his list of "12 unfair fighting game bosses that (almost) made us rage quit" in 2014. "Even if you ever do manage to finally defeat Akuma, it somehow doesn't feel earned. It's more like the computer felt sorry for you." Additionally, Akuma was named by CBR as the "Strongest Street Fighter Character", with comments "In 1996's Street Fighter Alpha 2, Akuma evolved into a more powerful form, Shin Akuma, and he evolved into the even more powerful Oni in 2010's Super Street Fighter IV. Since he's able to split mountains in that form, that version of Akuma stands as the most powerful being the Street Fighter universe."

Akuma's Oni incarnation has received a mixed reception. Both characters shared the top spot in Screen Rant's rating of the "12 Most Powerful Street Fighter Characters" the same year. "Akuma alone has destroyed an entire island, so whoever has to stand against the unbridled destructive force of Oni, all we can say is God help them." In another Screen Rant's list "Street Fighter: 8 Most Powerful (And 8 Most Worthless) Characters", Akuma placed first. "Whether he is Oni, Akuma, or something in-between (Shin Akuma, for instance), the dark master easily proves that he is at the top of the SF heap in terms of both in-universe power and effectiveness among players who have mastered using him." However, Imran Khan of Paste rated Oni as one of the "all-time worst" series characters: "Oni strips away the few bits of Akuma that are actually interesting as a character and turns him into a castaway from a Dragon Ball Z movie in design and development." Randolph Ramsay of GameSpot considered Oni "one of the least interesting additions" to Super Street Fighter IV, as he utilized moves similar to those of other characters.

Notes

References

Further reading
Street Fighter: The Violent History of Akuma (2016)—Den of Geek
A Brief History of Akuma: A Street Fighter Icon Turns 20 (2014)—Complex

Ansatsuken
Fictional assassins in video games
Capcom antagonists
Deity characters in video games
Demon characters in video games
Fictional gods
Fictional characters who have made pacts with devils
Fictional half-demons
Fictional Japanese people in video games
Fictional judoka
Fictional karateka
Fictional Shorinji Kempo practitioners
Fictional kyokushin kaikan practitioners
Fictional shotokan practitioners
Fictional murderers
Fictional taekwondo practitioners
Male characters in video games
Male supervillains
Male video game villains
Fictional martial artists in video games
Street Fighter characters
Power Rangers characters
Video game bosses
Video game characters introduced in 1994
Video game characters who can move at superhuman speeds
Video game characters who can teleport
Video game characters with electric or magnetic abilities
Video game characters with fire or heat abilities
Video game characters with slowed ageing
Video game characters with superhuman strength
Video game mascots